Standing French Navy Deployments is a list of current deployments by the French Navy:

Maritime zones
The French Navy maintains a continual naval presence in the maritime zones of its overseas departments and territories. Each maritime zone is host to either a naval base or naval facility to support the various ships deployed in these regions.
North Sea and English Channel Maritime zone
Atlantic Ocean Maritime zone
 Caribbean Sea Maritime Zone
 Guiana Maritime Zone
 Green Cape Maritime Zone
 Mediterranean Sea Maritime Zone
 Indian Ocean Maritime Zone
 Southern Indian Ocean Maritime Zone
 Pacific Ocean Maritime Zone
 French Polynesia Maritime Zone
 New Caledonia Maritime Zone

References

See also
 Blue-water navy
 Standing Royal Navy deployments
 Historic French Navy Deployments

French Navy
 Standing